Peter or Pete Dickson may refer to:

Peter Dickson (historian) (1929–2021), British historian
Peter Dickson (announcer) (born 1957), Northern Irish television announcer and voice-over artist
Peter Dickson (footballer) (born 1951), Scottish footballer
Peter Dickson (rower) (1945–2008), Australian rower who competed in the 1968 Summer Olympics
Pete Dickson, musician in  Mother Goose (band)

See also
Peter Dixon (disambiguation)